The men's decathlon competition at the 2006 Asian Games in Doha, Qatar was held on 10–11 December 2006 at the Khalifa International Stadium.

Schedule
All times are Arabia Standard Time (UTC+03:00)

Records

Results 
Legend
DNF — Did not finish
DNS — Did not start
NM — No mark

100 metres 
 Wind – Heat 1: +0.6 m/s
 Wind – Heat 2: +0.1 m/s

Long jump

Shot put

High jump

400 metres

110 metres hurdles 
 Wind – Heat 1: +0.3 m/s
 Wind – Heat 2: −0.6 m/s

Discus throw

Pole vault

Javelin throw

1500 metres

Summary

References

External links 
100m Results Heat 1
100m Results Heat 2
Long Jump Results
Shot Put Results
High Jump Results
400m Results Heat 1
400m Results Heat 2
110m Hurdles Results Heat 1
110m Hurdles Results Heat 2
Discus Throw Results
Pole Vault Results
Javelin Throw Results
1500m Results

Athletics at the 2006 Asian Games
2006